is a subway station on the Tokyo Metro Yurakucho Line in Chūō, Tokyo, Japan, operated by the Tokyo subway operator Tokyo Metro. It is numbered Y-19.

Lines
Through services operate to and from the Tobu Tojo Line and Seibu Ikebukuro Line.

Station layout
The station consists of two split platforms above and below each other on separate levels, serving two tracks. Platform 1 (for -bound trains) is on the third basement ("B3F") level, and platform 2 (for -bound trains) is on the fourth basement ("B4F") level.

Platforms

History
The station opened on 30 October 1974. Chest-high platform edge doors were brought into use at the station from 14 April 2012.

Passenger statistics
In fiscal 2012 the station was used by an average of 33,836 passengers daily. The passenger figures for previous years are as shown below.

Surrounding area
 Yurakucho Station ( Tokyo Metro Yurakucho Line)
 Ginza Station ( Tokyo Metro Ginza Line,  Tokyo Metro Marunouchi Line,  Tokyo Metro Hibiya Line)
 Kyobashi Station ( Tokyo Metro Ginza Line)
 National Route 15 ("Chuo Dori")
 Ginza Wako
 Matsuya Co.

See also
 List of railway stations in Japan

References

External links

 Ginza-itchōme Station information (Tokyo Metro) 

Stations of Tokyo Metro
Tokyo Metro Yurakucho Line
Railway stations in Tokyo
Railway stations in Japan opened in 1974
Ginza